Bro Morgannwg NHS Trust was an NHS Trust based in Bridgend, Mid Glamorgan.

History
The Chairman was Win Griffiths, and the Chief Executive was Paul Williams. The Trust served around 300,000 people, living in Neath, Port Talbot, Bridgend, and part of the Vale of Glamorgan (the Welsh name for which forms the trust's name).  It employed around 6,600 staff including more than 100 Consultants. It managed around 1,400 beds across 14 general and community hospitals. It ceased to exist as a distinct entity following a merger with Swansea NHS Trust on 1 April 2008 to form the Abertawe Bro Morgannwg University NHS Trust.

Major hospitals
Major hospitals were as follows:

Glanrhyd Hospital
Groeswen Hospital, closed in 2006.
Maesteg Community Hospital
Neath Port Talbot Hospital
The Princess of Wales Hospital
Tonna Hospital

Health centres
Pontardawe Health Centre

References
Bro Morgannwg NHS Trust

Defunct Welsh NHS Trusts
2008 disestablishments in Wales